Sweetness in the Salt (Traditional Chinese: 碧血鹽梟) is a TVB costume drama series released overseas in December 2008.

Synopsis
Nip Chi Yuen (Ma Steven), who works in the anti-smuggling camp, is determined to wipe out the Tau's Fort, which is the stronghold for salt smugglers. He pretends to be a down-and-out scholar. Tau Sing Suet (Yeung Tavia), daughter of the chief smuggler, sympathizes with YUEN and puts him up in the village. Later, they even become fond of each other. During an anti-smuggling operation Suet is badly hurt and has since been separated from Yuen and her family. She is saved by Wu Ting Hin (Wong Raymond), son of salt merchant Wu Kin (Kwok Fung). Hin takes her home. One day, Suet is horrified to see the dead bodies of her parent being hung on the wall of the city tower, and that the official standing on the top of the tower telling the public not to sell smuggled salt is none other than the man she misses day and night. She is heartbroken, and her love for Yuen turns into hatred that moment on.

Hin finds a job for Suet at the salt company his family runs to help her get over her unhappiness. To repay him, she devotes herself entirely to the job. As time goes by, Hin starts to fall in love with her. However his critical illness makes him hesitate to express his love for her. Suet's real identity comes to light when her younger uncle reappears out of the blue. Hin, for fear that his family will report Suet, proposes to her.

Cast

The Wu family

Other cast

Awards and nominations
TVB Anniversary Awards (2009)
 Nominated: Best Drama
 Nominated: Best Actor (Steven Ma) Top 5
 Nominated: Best Supporting Actor (Raymond Wong)

Viewership ratings

References

External links
TVB.com Sweetness in the Salt - Official Website 
K for TVB.net Sweetness in the Salt - Screen Captures and Summary 

TVB dramas
2009 Hong Kong television series debuts
2009 Hong Kong television series endings